Mozambique–Russia relations date back to the 1960s, when Russia began to support the struggle of Mozambique's Marxist-oriented FRELIMO party against Portuguese colonialism.  Most leaders of the FRELIMO were trained in Moscow.  Diplomatic relations were formally established on 25 June 1975, soon after Mozambique gained its independence from Portugal. In June 2007, both Russia and Mozambique signed an agreement on economic cooperation. Russia has an embassy in Maputo while Mozambique has an embassy in Moscow, Russia.

Security cooperation

During a visit to Maputo by Russian Foreign Minister Sergey Lavrov, it was announced that Russia would increase counter-terrorism cooperation with Mozambique.

Energy

In 2015, Rosneft was awarded three licenses to extract natural gas near the Rovuma basin, in partnership with Exxon Mobil.

See also 
 Foreign relations of Mozambique
 Foreign relations of Russia

References

External links 
  Documents on the Mozambique–Russia relationship from the Russian Ministry of Foreign Affairs
  Embassy of Russia in Maputo

 
Bilateral relations of Russia
Africa–Russia relations
Russia